Pocono Mountain School District, often abbreviated PMSD for short, is a large, rural public school district located in Monroe County in Northeastern Pennsylvania.

As of the 2020–21 school year, the district had an enrollment of 8,112 students in its schools, according to National Center for Education Statistics data.

The Pocono Mountain East attendance area includes: Jackson Township, Pocono Township, Paradise Township, Barrett Township and Mount Pocono Borough. The schools serving Pocono Mountain East are: Swiftwater Elementary Center (K-3), Swiftwater Intermediate School (4-6), Pocono Mountain East Junior High School (7-8), and Pocono Mountain East High School (9-12). It also includes a small area east of Route 380 that is Coolbaugh Township. Pocono Mountain West attendance area includes: Tobyhanna Township, Tunkhannock Township and most of Coolbaugh Township. The schools serving Pocono Mountain West include: Tobyhanna Elementary School (K-3), Clear Run Elementary School (K-2), Clear Run Intermediate School (3-6), Pocono Mountain West Junior High School, (7-8), and Pocono Mountain West High School (9-12). According to 2000 local census data, the district serves a resident population of approximately 60,000 people.

Pocono Mountain East High School is located in Swiftwater, Pennsylvania in the heart of The Poconos. The school currently houses students in grades nine through twelve, and is joined on the campus by the East Junior High School, Swiftwater Intermediate School and the newest school Swiftwater Elementary School, built in 2008.

Regions and constituent municipalities

The district is divided into three regions, which include the following municipalities:

Region I
Barrett Township
Paradise Township
Pocono Township

Region II
Jackson Township
Tobyhanna Township
Tunkhannock Township

Region III
Coolbaugh Township
Mount Pocono Borough

History 
Before the need for another campus complex, one high school served the entire district. The first high school of the district—originally called Pocono Mountain High School—Pocono Mountain East High School (PMEHS) is located in Swiftwater, Pennsylvania, along with Swiftwater Elementary Center (SEC), Swiftwater Intermediate School (SIS), and Pocono Mountain East Junior High School (PMEJHS). All four schools share the same campus. Starting in the 2013–14 school year, those who attend the East campus attend SEC for grades K - 3, SIS for grades 4 - 6, PMEJHS for grades 7 - 8, and PMEHS for grades 9 - 12. Before 2008, the building that is now SEC did not exist. The current intermediate school was then the elementary school, and the junior high school was the intermediate school.

Once the district split, the West high school was built in 2002. Those who attend the West campus attend either Tobyhanna Elementary Center (TEC- Pocono Pines), Clear Run Elementary Center (CREC -Mt. Pocono), or Coolbaugh Elementary and Learning Centers (CEC/CLC -Tobyhanna). Students then all come together and attend the middle school at Clear Run Intermediate School (CRIS- Mt.Pocono) across from CREC. After spending two years there, students are then moved over to the West Junior High School on the Sullivan Trail Campus, across from the West high school.  The Class of 2006 was the first graduating class to attend West for the full four years.

In May 2012, the Pocono Mountain School Board closed three schools due to sharply declining enrollment and significant budget shortfall. It closed:Coolbaugh Elementary Center, Swiftwater Intermediate, and Coolbaugh Learning Center.  The closing brought the layoffs of 280 district employees, 142 of which are professional staff, which includes administrators and teachers.
The Intermediate school at Clear Run opened in 1995 with The elementary Center which opened In 1997. In 2002 before the new Campus was constructed they renamed clear run schools to a better and shorter name.
Swiftwater Intermediate was opened in 1998, both Intermediate Schools severed grades 6–8.

Extracurriculars
The Pocono Mountain School District offers a variety of clubs, activities and an extensive sports program.

Mascots 
The entire district was originally home of the Cardinals. However, when it was determined that a new school would have to be built, another squad was then needed. The Cardinals still remain at the original high school, the East high school. Barrett Elementary Center, Pocono Elementary Center, and Swiftwater Elementary Center are also Cardinals.  PM West is home to the Panthers. The Cardinals are red and white, and the Panthers are blue and silver.

Athletics 

Both Pocono Mountain East and Pocono Mountain West High Schools compete athletically in the Eastern Pennsylvania Conference (EPC) in the District XI division of the Pennsylvania Interscholastic Athletic Association, one of the premier high school athletic divisions in the nation.

Sports
The school districts sports include:
Pocono Mountain East High School

Boys
Baseball - AAAAA
Basketball- AAAA
Cross country - AAA
Football - AAAA
Golf - AAA
Soccer - AAA
Swimming and Diving - AAA
Tennis - AAA
Track and Field - AAA
Wrestling - AAA

Girls
Basketball - AAAA
Cross country - AAA
Field hockey - AAA
Soccer (Fall) - AAA
Softball - AAAA
Swimming and diving - AAA
Tennis - AAA
Track and Field - AAA
Volleyball - AAA

Pocono Mountain West High School

Boys
Baseball - AAAA
Basketball- AAAA
Cross country - AAA
Football - AAAA
Golf - AAA
Soccer - AAA
Swimming and Diving - AAA
Tennis - AAA
Track and field - AAA
Wrestling - AAA

Girls
Basketball - AAAA
Cheerleading - AAAA
Cross country - AAA
Field hockey - AAA
Soccer (Fall) - AAA
Softball - AAAA
Swimming and diving - AAA
Tennis - AAA
Track and field - AAA
Volleyball - AAA

Pocono Mountain West Junior High School

Boys
Baseball
Basketball
Cross Country
Football
Golf
Soccer
Swimming and diving
Tennis
Track and field
Wrestling	

Girls
Basketball
Cross Country
Golf
Field hockey
Softball 
Swimming and diving
Tennis
Track and field
Volleyball

According to PIAA directory July 2012

Notable alumni
Eric Frein, domestic terrorist behind 2014 Pennsylvania State Police barracks attack
Kelly Monaco, model

References

External links
 
Pocono Mountain High School East official website
Pocono Mountain High School East sports coverage at The Express-Times

Pocono Mountains
School districts in Monroe County, Pennsylvania